Flat Rock (also known as Macks Inn) was a former unincorporated community along Henrys Fork in Fremont County, Idaho, United States, that is now part of the city of Island Park.

Island Park is part of the Rexburg Micropolitan Statistical Area.

Transportation
A U.S. Highway passes through the community, as did a former U.S. Highway:
 
 , until it was rerouted entirely out of the state of Idaho in 1981

See also
 Lake, Idaho
 Last Chance, Idaho
 Staley Springs, Idaho

References

Unincorporated communities in Fremont County, Idaho
Unincorporated communities in Idaho
Island Park, Idaho
Rexburg, Idaho micropolitan area
Former populated places in Idaho